Kerry Anne Chikarovski  (née Bartels; 4 April 1956) is a former Australian politician who served as leader of the Liberal Party in New South Wales and Leader of the Opposition between 1998 and 2002, the first woman to hold the post.

Early life and career

Chikarovski was born in Sydney to Jill and former Willoughby Mayor Greg Bartels AM. In 1964, her father took up a post working at the United Nations headquarters in New York, and she, along with her mother and three sisters, also moved, living there for the next five years. It was while living in New York that Chikarovski had a brief encounter with Robert F. Kennedy, which would influence her decision to go into politics years later.

Upon returning to Sydney, Chikarovski finished her schooling at Monte Sant' Angelo Mercy College, in North Sydney. She completed a combined economics and law degree at the University of Sydney. While at University she joined the Economics Society, followed by the Law Society, where she was eventually elected as its first female president. She was also elected to the Board of the University of Sydney Union.

While at University, Chikarovski met her future husband, Kris Chikarovski, and they married in 1979. Following a brief career in private practice, she went on to lecture part-time at the College of Law before entering parliament.

Political career

Following the resignation of incumbent John Dowd, Chikarovski won pre-selection for the safe Liberal seat of Lane Cove in 1991, her primary competition for which was then MLC John Hannaford. In 1992, she was appointed Minister for Consumer Affairs and Assistant Minister for Education (3 July 1992 – 26 May 1993). During her time as Minister, Kerry facilitated national agreement to the Introduction of a Uniform Credit Code.

In 1993, she became Minister for Industrial Relations and Employment and established the department responsible for the Minister for The Status of Women (29 May 1993 – 4 April 1995). With her dual responsibilities of Industrial Relations and Women, Kerry oversaw the development and introduction of flexible working conditions for the public sector and the implementation of mentoring programs to encourage women to seek careers at the highest level of the NSW public service.

Chikarovski replaced Bruce Baird as Deputy Leader of the Liberal Party in December 1994 and held that post until the Liberal Party was defeated in 1995.

Leader of the Opposition
On 8 December 1998, she replaced Peter Collins as leader, and also held the position of Shadow Minister for the Arts, Ethnic Affairs and Women. In 1999 she lost the state election to Labor Premier Bob Carr in a landslide. In 2002, John Brogden, a member of her shadow cabinet, announced a challenge to her leadership. Despite the endorsement of Prime Minister John Howard – himself a Sydney-sider – Chikarovski lost the leadership to Brogden by one vote.

At the March 2003 election, Chikarovski retired from parliament.

Post political career
Following her resignation from Parliament in 2003, in 2004 she launched her co-authored autobiography, Chika.

She is a passionate advocate for women in sport and is previous Trustee of the Sydney Cricket and Sports Ground Trust.

Chikarovski was appointed a Member of the Order of Australia for "significant service to the Parliament of New South Wales, and to the community" in the 2021 Queen's Birthday Honours.

Directorships
Chikarovski also serves as a director on a number of sporting, government and not for profit boards:

Adopt Change
Our Watch
New South Wales Rugby Union
Humpty Dumpty Foundation

She is the Chair of Road Safety Education. Chikarovski is an Ambassador of the Australian Indigenous Education Foundation and advisor to the Taronga Group.

References

 

|-

|-

|-

|-

|-

1956 births
Living people
Leaders of the Opposition in New South Wales
Liberal Party of Australia members of the Parliament of New South Wales
Members of the New South Wales Legislative Assembly
Members of the Order of Australia
21st-century Australian politicians
21st-century Australian women politicians
Women members of the New South Wales Legislative Assembly
People educated at Monte Sant'Angelo Mercy College
